Bulcock is an English surname. Notable people with the surname include:

Emily Bulcock (1877–1969), Australian poet and journalist
Frank Bulcock (1892–1973), Australian politician
Joe Bulcock (1880–1918), English footballer
Leslie Bulcock (1913–2001), English cricketer
Philip Bulcock (born 1970), British actor
Robert Bulcock (1832–1900), Australian politician

English-language surnames